Italian Spiderman is an Australian film parody of Italian action–adventure films of the 1960s and 1970s, first released on YouTube in 2007. The parody purports to be a "lost Italian film" by Alrugo Entertainment, an Australian film-making collective formed by Dario Russo, Tait Wilson, David Ashby, Will Spartalis and Boris Repasky.

Ostensibly an Italian take on the comic book superhero Spider-Man, the film is a reference to foreign movies that misappropriate popular American superheroes such as the Turkish film 3 Dev Adam, and licensed series such as the Japanese TV series Spider-Man, both of which alter the character of Spider-Man for foreign audiences.

A trailer was released, followed by a full-length feature made up of ten mini-episodes.

Plot

In the middle of a party, an asteroid from a distant galaxy falls to Earth and is taken by professor Bernardi (Carmine Russo) for research. He discovers the asteroid has a substance that can create duplicates from any living being and decides that Italian Spiderman (David Ashby, credited as "Franco Franchetti"), a fat, rude, chain-smoking, and powerful superhero, is the only man capable of holding custody of the valuable asteroid.

As soon as Professor Bernardi gives Italian Spiderman the asteroid, he is attacked by the terrible Captain Maximum (Leombruno Tosca) who is interested in using the asteroid for his own evil plans. Foiled in his attempt to steal the asteroid from Bernardi, he transforms the Professor into a snake. Captain Maximum later intercepts the Italian Spiderman and takes the asteroid, although he gives Italian Spiderman a chance to win it by beating Maximum in a surf contest. When Captain Maximum notices the obviously superior surfing skills of Italian Spiderman, Maximum attempts to win by cheating. His efforts fail, however, as Italian Spiderman summons the help of penguins (which hurl themselves at Captain Maximum and his henchwomen) and wins.
When Italian Spiderman returns home, he is again attacked by Captain Maximum's henchmen, where a tranquilliser dart causes the hero to collapse.

Waking up in Captain Maximum's lair he witnesses how the professor is forced to use the powers of duplication on one of Captain Maximum's henchmen. Italian Spiderman is forced to watch as the professor is shot by Maximum. The furious Italian Spiderman attacks Maximum's henchmen, killing many in a surprisingly gory battle sequence. Despite Italian Spiderman's efforts the Professor dies but in his last moments gives the Italian Spiderman the potion.  Italian Spiderman again attacks the headquarters of Captain Maximum. Despite having the potion, Italian Spiderman overwhelms Captain Maximum's henchmen by his powers alone (showing in the process to have a venomous bite and removable moustaches that can double as razor-sharp boomerangs). Later, Italian Spiderman returns home with the Professor's niece, Jessica (Susanna Dekker). When a gigantic Captain Maximum lays siege to the city, Italian Spiderman finally drinks the potion, growing to the same height of Captain Maximum and battling him until the titles roll.

Crew
Director – Dario Russo
Producer – Dario Russo
Director of Photography – Sam King
Production Design – Tait Wilson
Costume Design and Makeup – Sophie Spalding and Chloe Spalding
Prop Builders – Bluey Byrne and Brad Maddern
Sound Design & Score – Will Spartalis
Original Music – Dario Russo, Will Spartalis and Josh Van Looy
Editor – Dario Russo
Gaffer – Sarah Macdonald
1st Camera Assistant – Vivyan Madigan
Grip – Henry Smith
Squirrel Grip – Matt Veseley
Production Assistant – Sarah Bond
Stills Photography – Lucy Spartalis

Project history

The project began as a trailer for a non-existent film, produced as a student film at Flinders University by director Dario Russo for his final year Screen Production project. The "trailer" was shot, over the course of one day, on 16 mm film using an older style camera to achieve an authentic look for the films of that era.

The trailer stars "Franco Franchetti" (David Ashby) as "Italian Spiderman" and features "Jessica" portrayed by actress Susanna Dekker, in the famous scene with the line "Fammi un macchiato, pronto".

Publicized as an actual lost Italian action film from the late 1960s, the film was later uploaded onto YouTube on 8 November 2007 where it has gained 7.3 million hits as of June 2022. With some of mainstream media taking interest in the film, this led to the South Australian Film Corporation giving the filmmakers funding for ten more short films.

The first installment of the "feature film" premiered across the Internet on 22 May 2008; further instalments followed on a weekly basis.

The series was well-received, but ended on a cliffhanger. The May 2010 announcement of the end of Alrugo Entertainment cast doubt on the possible continuation of the project.

On 24 October 2011, a video announcement was made declaring the end of the Italian Spiderman project and the formation of a new production company between Dario Russo and David Ashby, called Dinosaur. The same video also officially announced the duo's television show, Danger 5.

Soundtrack

Seven-inch single / Digital download
"Italian Spiderman theme"/"Bangarang" Enzo Bontempi (Record Kicks / Soulful Torino Records RK45 017/STR003)

See also

 Danger 5
 Black Dynamite
 Exploitation film
 Giallo
 Forgotten Silver
 Garth Marenghi's Darkplace

References

External links
 Official Alrugo YouTube account containing the original trailer and the serialized film
 Official Will Spartalis link for the full film
 Soulful Torino Records: Here comes the Italian Spiderman!
 The World Today: Students' Italian Spiderman nets film funding
 Dario Russo's Interview (italian text)

2000s parody films
2000s superhero films
2007 comedy films
2007 films
2007 YouTube videos
Australian comedy web series
2000s Italian-language films
Parodies of Spider-Man
Unofficial Spider-Man films
Viral videos
Superhero comedy films
2000s American films